The House of Bernarda Alba is a play written by Federico García Lorca (1945) that has been made into several films and a musical:

The House of Bernarda Alba (1982 film), a 1982 Mexican film
The House of Bernarda Alba (1987 film), a 1987 Spanish film
The House of Bernarda Alba (1991 film), a 1991 UK film
Bernarda Alba (musical), a 2006 Off-Broadway musical